Eximilimosina is a genus of flies belonging to the family Lesser Dung flies.

Species
E. eximia (Papp, 1991)
E. elegantula (Duda, 1925)
E. major Papp, 2008
E. thailandica Papp, 2008

References

Sphaeroceridae
Diptera of Asia
Brachycera genera